Results of the 2011 Sri Lankan local government elections by province, district and local authority.

Province

District

Local authority

Footnotes

References
 
 
 

2011 Sri Lankan local government elections
Election results in Sri Lanka